B. S. Savnekar was an Indian politician, who was a member of Rajya Sabha (upper house) from 1960 to 1966 and 1966 and 1972. He was born in 1902 at Sawana in Bombay Presidency and was educated at Indore, Central Provinces. He was from Indian National Congress party.

Positions held

See also 
 List of Rajya Sabha members from Maharashtra
 1966 Indian Rajya Sabha elections
 1960 Indian Rajya Sabha elections

References

1902 births
Nationalist Congress Party politicians from Maharashtra
Rajya Sabha members from Maharashtra
Indian National Congress politicians from Maharashtra
Year of death missing